Meka Srikanth (born 23 March 1968) is an Indian actor who is known for works predominantly in Telugu cinema. He has appeared in more than 120 films. The actor has received one state Nandi Award, and one Filmfare Award South. He has starred in films like Swarabhishekam, which won the National Film Award for Best Feature Film in Telugu for 2004. Srikanth's another film Virodhi premiered at the Indian panorama section, at the 2011 International Film Festival of India. Sri Rama Rajyam also had a special screening at International Film Festival of India on 28 November 2011. He has also appeared in some other language films including  Kannada, Malayalam and Tamil films.

Early life
Srikanth was born on 23 March 1968 in Gangavati of present-day Karnataka, India. His father, Meka Parameswara Rao (19462020), was a wealthy landlord who migrated from Mekavaripalem of Krishna district, Andhra Pradesh to Gangavati. He graduated with a Bachelor of Commerce degree from Karnataka University, Dharwad and moved to Chennai to pursue a career in films.

Personal life 
Srikanth married Ooha on 20 January 1997, and has two sons, Roshan and Rohan and a daughter, Medha. The family lives in Jubilee Hills, Hyderabad.

Career
In 1990, Srikanth joined Madhu Film and TV Institute of Acting in Hyderabad and completed a one-year course in acting. His first film People's Encounter was released in 1991. Srikanth played minor roles as a villain and supporting artiste early in his career. He became a lead actor with the film One by Two. He has starred in more than 100 Telugu films as a lead. His first hit film as a lead actor was Taj Mahal, which was released in 1995.

Srikanth collaborated with film directors like S.V. Krishna Reddy, Krishna Vamsi, Jayanth C. Paranjee, G. Neelakanta Reddy, EVV Satyanarayana and K. Viswanath to give hits like Varasudu, Vinodam, Egire Paavurama, Aahvaanam, Maa Nannaki Pelli, Khadgam, Shankar Dada M.B.B.S., Pellam Oorelithe, Evandoi Srivaru, Kshemamga Velli Labamgarandi, O Chinnadana, Shankar Dada Zindabad,  Operation Duryodhana, Mahatma, and Govindudu Andarivadele.

Filmography

Films

Television

Awards 
 Nandi Special Jury Award - Mahatma
 Filmfare Best Supporting Actor Award - Shankar Dada M.B.B.S.
 Filmfare Best Supporting Actor Award - Govindudu Andarivadele - Nominated
SIIMA Award for Best Supporting Actor (Telugu) - Sarrainodu  
15th Santhosham Film Awards for Best Supporting Actor (Telugu) - Sarrainodu
SIIMA Award for Best Actor in a Negative Role (Telugu) - Akhanda

References

External links
 

Living people
Nandi Award winners
Filmfare Awards South winners
People from Koppal district
1968 births
Male actors in Telugu cinema
South Indian International Movie Awards winners
Santosham Film Awards winners
Indian male film actors
Indian male actors
Male actors from Karnataka
Telugu male actors
Karnatak University alumni